The Baton Rouge Police Department (BRPD) (French: Département de Police de Bâton Rouge) is the primary law enforcement agency in the city of Baton Rouge, Louisiana. The Chief of Police, as of March 8, 2018, was Murphy Paul.

The BRPD was formally established in 1865, just after the end of the Civil War, with the appointment of the first Chief of Police.

The BRPD has a history of police brutality against Blacks and strained relations with the black community in Baton Rouge. Most recently, in 2016, two BRPD officers shot and killed Alton Sterling, a 37-year-old black man, while trying to detain him. The police killing lead to protests and demonstrations in Baton Rouge and elsewhere, leading to the arrests of hundreds of individuals. Due to the violence and arrests that erupted at these protests, local organizing groups and the Louisiana branch of the American Civil Liberties Union filed a lawsuit against the Baton Route Police Department for violating the First Amendment rights of protesting individuals. Less than two weeks after the killing of Alton Sterling, three BRPD officers were shot and killed by Gavin Eugene Long in a shootout.

Rank structure

The Chief of Police is appointed by, and reports to, the Mayor. The Chief is assisted by four Deputy Chiefs who are appointed by The Chief of Police.  All other police positions are promotional and based on seniority, as mandated by state civil service law.

Baton Rouge Chiefs of Police

See also

 List of law enforcement agencies in Louisiana
 International Union of Police Associations
 Officer Down Memorial Page
 Shooting of Alton Sterling
 2016 shooting of Baton Rouge police officers

References

External links
 Official website

Municipal police departments of Louisiana
Government of Baton Rouge, Louisiana
1865 establishments in Louisiana
Government agencies established in 1865